The Dortmund Open was an darts tournament that has been held from 1985 until 2012.

List of winners

1980 establishments in Germany
2012 disestablishments in Germany
Darts tournaments